Andreas Iraklis (born 16 May 1989) is a Greek footballer, who plays for Aittitos Spata.

Club career

Iraklis started his career in Ajax Tavros during 2005 before being transferred to Panionios in 2007, he was loaned to Koropi before signing for Kallithea where he spent three years earning 67 caps.
In 2012, he was transferred to Aris Thessaloniki.

References 

Βόμβες με Ευθυμιάδη, Κοντέων και Ηρακλή, ο Παναργειακός! ΑΠΟΚΛΕΙΣΤΙΚΟ‚ sportstonoto.gr, 15 January 2016

External links
 
Myplayer.gr Profile
Onsports.gr Profile

1989 births
Living people
Greek footballers
Footballers from Thessaloniki
Super League Greece players
Panionios F.C. players
Kallithea F.C. players
Aris Thessaloniki F.C. players
Apollon Smyrnis F.C. players
Association football midfielders
Association football fullbacks